The USCGC Mallow (WLB-396) was a  belonging to the United States Coast Guard launched on 9 December 1943 and commissioned on 6 June 1944.

Design
The s were constructed after the s. It was powered by one electric motor. This was connected up to two Westinghouse generators which were driven by two Cooper Bessemer GND-8 four-cycle diesel engines. She had a single screw.

The ships had a complement of six officers and seventy-four crew members in 1945; this decreased to two warrants, four officers, and forty-seven men in 1966. They were fitted with a SL1 radar system and QBE-3A sonar system in 1945. Their armament consisted of one 3"/50 caliber gun, two 20 mm/80 guns, two Mousetraps, two depth charge tracks, and four Y-guns in 1945; these were removed in 1966.

Career 

Upon being commissioned in June 1944, Mallow was assigned to the 12th Coast Guard District and homeported in San Francisco where she was used for ATON in the Pacific until the end of World War II. After the war, starting in September 1946, she was stationed in Astoria, Oregon. In February 1958, Mallow assisted  with towing  6 miles south of Swiftsure Bank. In February 1989, she assisted with recovering debris from the United Airlines Flight 811 crash off Hawaii.
The Mallow was scrapped at the head of the Wicomico River in Salisbury Maryland.

See also
 List of United States Coast Guard cutters

References

External links

Historic American Engineering Record in Hawaii
Iris-class seagoing buoy tenders
1944 ships
Ships built in Duluth, Minnesota